The Horsethief Sandstone is a Mesozoic geologic formation in Montana. Dinosaur remains are among the fossils that have been recovered from the formation, although none have yet been referred to a specific genus. The southern part of the Two Medicine Formation grades into the brackish water siltstone/sandstone series that compose the Horsethief Formation. To the north the Horsethief Sandstone is equivalent to the Blood Reserve Formation of Alberta, Canada.

The sediments of the Horsethief represent shallower water deposits than those of the Bearpaw Shale, adding further evidence that higher elevation areas existed to the south of the Two Medicine Formation's depositional area.

See also

 List of dinosaur-bearing rock formations
 List of stratigraphic units with indeterminate dinosaur fossils

Footnotes

References
 Trexler, D., 2001, Two Medicine Formation, Montana: geology and fauna: In:  Mesozoic Vertebrate Life, edited by Tanke, D. H., and Carpenter, K., Indiana  University Press, pp. 298–309.
 Weishampel, David B.; Dodson, Peter; and Osmólska, Halszka (eds.): The Dinosauria, 2nd, Berkeley: University of California Press. 861 pp. .

Geologic formations of Montana
Sandstone formations of the United States
Maastrichtian Stage of North America
Cretaceous Montana